The Big Green is a 1995 American family sports comedy film by Walt Disney Pictures starring Olivia d'Abo and Steve Guttenberg, written and directed by Holly Goldberg Sloan. It also stars Bug Hall, Chauncey Leopardi, and Patrick Renna. The film is about the antics of a soccer team consisting of a misfit group of small town Texas kids who are coached by a teacher from England.

Plot
Anna Montgomery, a teacher who is on an exchange program from Surrey, England, is placed into a school in the fictional small town of Elma, Texas. She initially struggles to connect with her students, as they believe they are underachievers doomed to dead end lives. One day, instead of teaching geography to the inattentive class, Anna breaks the globe in an attempt to pique the kids' interest. After some confusion, the children start learning the game of soccer. After the first practice, Anna tells them she has entered them into a league in Austin, Texas, but their first game is the following day. The town Sheriff's Deputy Tom Palmer becomes co-coach while at the same time begins falling for Anna.

The team travels to Austin to play the Knights, who are the top team in the league. However, none of the kids fully understand know how to play, and they lose 18–0. They decide not to play anymore, until they discover the talent of new classmate Juan Morales, but have to persuade his reluctant mother to let him play. The team, now known as the Big Green, steadily improves with Juan, and they go on a remarkable run with a record of eight wins, two losses, and one tie, which earns them a re-match against the Knights in the championship. As the town goes crazy for the final, hometown boy and current Knights coach Jay Huffer returns to Elma, and finds in the bar the drunken and prejudiced father of Kate Douglas, one of the players. He tells Jay, who works as an auditor for the IRS, via bribery that Juan's mother is an illegal immigrant. Later, Tom is forced to investigate the matter, forcing Juan and his mother to flee Elma. Kate is left furious with both her father and Tom over the situation, but Anna convinces her to stay on the team.

On the day of the championship, Tom searches for Juan, but is unable to find him before the start of the match, and by halftime the team is down 2–0. With 10 minutes left in the game, Juan arrives with Tom and his mother, where Tom announces he is now the sponsor for Juan's mother, meaning they can stay in the country. Juan enters the game and sets up Elma's first goal, and with the last kick of the match, scores the equalizer to tie the game, 2-2, forcing the championship to be decided in a penalty shootout. In the final round with the score still tied, the Knights captain and son of the coach, Jay Huffer Jr., steps onto the field. The Big Green goalie Larry Musgrove, who suffers from visions of the opposition players becoming "monsters," manages to turn himself into a monster in his own fantasy, in order to psych out the opponent and save the kick. The final kick for the championship is taken by the Big Green's smallest and youngest player, Newt Shaw. He scores on his kick, giving the Big Green the championship. Huffer, having made a bet with Anna if his Knights were to lose, kisses the Big Green's goat mascot, much to his disgust.

The final scene shows a new billboard in Elma, featuring the team and highlighting their success on the field and in the classroom.

Cast 
 Patrick Renna as Larry Musgrove
 Steve Guttenberg as Deputy Sheriff Tom Palmer
 Jay O. Sanders as Coach Jay Huffer
 John Terry as Edwin V. Douglas
 Chauncey Leopardi as Evan Schiff
 Olivia d'Abo as Miss Anna Montgomery
 Billy L. Sullivan as Jeffrey Luttrell
 Yareli Arizmendi as Marbelly Morales
 Bug Hall as Newt Shaw
 Jessica Robertson as Kate Douglas
 Jordan Brower as Nick Anderssen
 Libby Villari as Brenda Neilson
 Anthony Esquivel as Juan Morales
 Hayley Kolb as Sophia Convertino
 Haley Miller as Polly Neilson
 Ashley Welch as Lou Gates
 Ariel Welch as Sue Gates
 Jimmy Higa as Tak Yamato
 Gil Glasgow as Cookie Musgrove

Production
The movie was shot near and around Austin, Texas in Autumn of 1994.

Reception

Box office
It was released in U.S. theaters on September 27, 1995, taking in $4,688,285 on its opening Wednesday. The total box office revenue for the movie was $17,725,500.

The film went on to sell over five million units on video when it was released on January 31, 1996.

Stephen Holden gave it a favorable review in The New York Times: "Most of the movie's charm lies in its portrayal of the children as an adorable, if exasperating, multicultural version of Our Gang."

The Dove Foundation in their review wrote: "Written by the same screenwriter who wrote ANGELS IN THE OUTFIELD, THE BIG GREEN develops its fun and excitement without resorting to crude humor, sex or obscene language.  THE BIG GREEN is a feel good movie and it is encouraging to see such a quality film make its appearance in lieu of the usual degenerate fare so prevalent today."

In a generally favorable review, John Anderson in the Los Angeles Times described the film as a "puckless Mighty Ducks" and described the young characters as an "endearing group".

Common Sense Media gave The Big Green 3 out of 5 stars, listing it as the third best soccer film made for kids.

Home media
The film was released on VHS and LaserDisc on January 31, 1996, in DVD on May 4, 2004 and also in Blu-Ray on July 13, 2021.  It is also included on Disney's streaming service, Disney+.

References

External links
 
 
 
 
 

1995 films
American association football films
Caravan Pictures films
Films set in Texas
Films shot in Texas
1990s sports comedy films
Walt Disney Pictures films
Films directed by Holly Goldberg Sloan
Films produced by Roger Birnbaum
Films scored by Randy Edelman
American sports comedy films
1995 directorial debut films
1995 comedy films
1990s English-language films
1990s American films